Jonathan Shearer  is a British media personality. He was the winner of the BBC television series Castaway 2007.

Biography 
Shearer was born in Glasgow.  He had started (but it is not certain he graduated) several degrees, having studied Chemical Engineering at University of Edinburgh, Philosophy and Law at University of Kent, Education at University of Cambridge and Zoology at University of Leeds. For many years he lived an itinerant lifestyle in countries such as Ethiopia, Kazakhstan, Thailand, Vietnam, Brazil and Nigeria, and is a skilled linguist, speaking Portuguese, French and Spanish. Whilst having spent much time as a teacher, he also worked as a professional psychic, barman, sewer digger, zoo-keeper, dog trainer, RSPB officer, banker and tarot card reader.  He has taught rifle shooting to delinquents and carried out refuge work for the Lumholtz's tree kangaroo. He also considered becoming a monk, but admits that "the monks didn't want me." Shearer is currently resident in Beijing where he copy-edits for Xinhua News Agency.

Shearer has been engaged at least five times.

A self-confessed loner, at the time of the program, Jonathan was living on the island of Benbecula in Scotland, cleaning hotel rooms to support his poorly paid ornithology work for the RSPB. He says: "I have a strong dislike for the kind of deeply earnest, green, touchy-feely idiots whom I suspect you are going to populate your island with."

Jonathan made it to the grand final on 27 May and won Castaway 2007.

References

1965 births
Living people
Reality show winners
Alumni of the University of Edinburgh